One Way Street is a 1950 American film noir crime film directed by Hugo Fregonese and starring James Mason, Märta Torén and Dan Duryea. The crime film takes place mainly in Mexico.

Plot
Dr. Frank Matson, a physician, steals $200,000 from the henchmen of mob boss John Wheeler, after a robbery that Wheeler has pulled off along with Ollie, a member of his gang. Forced to go on the run, Matson also takes Wheeler's girlfriend Laura Thorsen with him.

After hiding out in Mexico, word gets back to Matson that Wheeler knows where he is. He and Laura return to Los Angeles planning to return the money, only to find Wheeler has been shot by Ollie. About to meet the same fate, Matson produces a gun and kills Ollie instead.

Laura is waiting for him at a cafe. As they leave, Matson turns to go phone the airline to get away with Laura, but is hit by a car coming down the one-way street.

Cast
 James Mason as Dr. Frank Matson 
 Märta Torén as Laura Thorsen (as Marta Toren)
 Dan Duryea as John Wheeler 
 Basil Ruysdael as Father Moreno 
 William Conrad as Ollie
 Rodolfo Acosta as Francisco Morales 
 King Donovan as Grieder
 Robert Espinoza as Santiago 
 Tito Renaldo as Hank Morales
 Margarito Luna as Antania Morales 
 Emma Roldán as Catalina (as Emma Roldan)
 George J. Lewis as Capt. Rodriguez (as George Lewis)
 James Best as Driver (uncredited)
 Jack Elam as Arnie (uncredited)
 Rock Hudson as Truck Driver (uncredited)

Production
Jeff Chandler was originally announced for the lead.

Reception
Film critic Bosley Crowther dismissed the film as uninteresting, "Perhaps it is all the fault of the script, which has our hero vacillating between a life of crime and regeneration via a lady's love and an honest but unremunerative practice. What it all adds up to is a standard romantic melodrama illustrating the facts that crime obviously doesn't pay and that the scenery and people below the border are colorful ... Like its title, One Way Street is explicitly obvious and not especially exciting."

See also
 List of American films of 1950

References

External links
 
 
 
 
 

1950 films
1950 crime films
American crime films
American black-and-white films
Film noir
Films directed by Hugo Fregonese
Universal Pictures films
Films set in Mexico
Films scored by Frank Skinner
1950s English-language films
1950s American films